Mohnyin Township (also Kamaing Township) is a township of Mohnyin District in the Kachin State of Burma (Myanmar). The principal town and administrative centre is Mohnyin. Jade and gem quality kyanite are produced in Mohnyin Township, as well as amber, gold, asafoetida, and jasper.
Indawgyi Lake Wildlife Sanctuary is located in the central north of the township.

Hopin Sub-township is part of Mohnyin Township. Hopin Sub-township is constituted with one town, four wards, 8 village tracts and 27 villages in 2012. There are 8,315 households with a population of 49,160.

Notes

External links
 "Mohnyin Google Satellite Map" map of administrative area with listing of principal settlements, from Maplandia

Townships of Kachin State